This page is a list of the continental championships for clubs and national teams in association football.

The championships are organised by the respective FIFA-affiliated continental confederations: AFC (Asia), CAF (Africa), CONCACAF (North and Central America and the Caribbean), CONMEBOL (South America), OFC (Oceania), and UEFA (Europe).

The numbers of participating teams presented in this article only account for teams appearing in the competitions proper, and do not include those entering preliminary or qualifying rounds.

Men's national team championships

Ongoing

Men's club championships

Ongoing

The champions of the respective first-tier championships qualify for the FIFA Club World Cup.

Abolished

Women's national team championships

Women's club championships

See also
Sub-continental football championships in Asia
Domestic football champions
Timeline of association football

References

International association football competitions by continent